Deborah Sinclair is a Canadian social worker who has specialized in working with women who are victims of intimate partner violence.  She served as an expert witness in court cases where intimate partner violence has played a role.  She has been working with victims of violence for over thirty years.

In 1985, the Ontario Ministry of Community and Social Services published a 185-page manual Sinclair wrote, entitled Understanding Wife Assault A Training Manual for Counsellors and Advocates. Lois Mitchell quotes Sinclair's book in the Baptist Atlantic: "Two-fifths of all homicides in Canada are between spouses. The vast majority of the victims are women.Those women who do kill their partners are usually acting in self-defence."  Transition House, a shelter in Newfoundland, quotes Sinclair's definition of abuse on its home page. In her 1998 book, Search for a Safe Place, Vijay Agnew notes Sinclair's book does not address the complications of abuse in minority communities from different cultures.

In 2002, Sinclair gave several days of testimony before the inquest into the deaths of Gillian and Ralph Hadley, a murder-suicide.  She noted that support for men at risk of abusing their partners was not available, unless they had already been charged with a violent crime.

In 2014, she was a witness in R. v. Hutt, a case in which a husband was sentenced to life imprisonment for murder, and, in 2018, she was an expert witness for the prosecution in the trial against Joshua Boyle

References

Year of birth missing (living people)
Canadian social workers
Living people